Barbara Filipović (born May 31, 1997) is a Croatian model and beauty pageant titleholder who was crowned Miss Universe Croatia 2016.

She represented Croatia at the Miss Universe 2016 pageant but Unplaced.

Early life
Filipović was born in Zagreb. She graduated from V. Gimnazija in Zagreb, and speaks fluent English and Croatian. She aspires to work as a wildlife veterinarian and she is a student of Veterinary Medicine in Zagreb.

Pageantry

Miss Universe Croatia 2016
Filipović was crowned as Miss Universe Croatia 2016 on April 15, 2016, at the Crystal Ballroom, Hotel Westin in Zagreb. Paula Čaić was adjudged as first runner up and Marija Kljajić was titled as second runner up.

Miss Universe 2016
Filipović competed at Miss Universe 2016 pageant in Manila, Philippines but Unplaced.

References

External links
Official Miss Universe Hrvatske website

1997 births
Living people
Miss Universe 2016 contestants
Croatian beauty pageant winners